Tongapōrutu is a settlement in northern Taranaki, in the North Island of New Zealand. It is located on State Highway 3 at the mouth of the Tongaporutu River, 15 kilometres south of Mokau. Tongapōrutu is well known in New Zealand for its 'Three Sisters' rock formations and its Māori petroglyphs carved into cave rock walls. However, both the Māori rock carvings and the 'Three Sisters formations are constantly being eroded by the Tasman Sea.

Further reading

General historical works

Business history

 in New Plymouth contains the letter book of the Waitara-based shipping agent, Lewis Clare (died 1960). This book records coastal shipping from and into small North Taranaki ports (including those mentioned in de Jardine's book) between 1910 and 1920. See

Churches

Anglican

Geology
  
  Scale: 1: 63 360 (i.e. 1 in. to the mile)
  Scale: 1: 63 360 (i.e. 1 in. to the mile)
  Scale: 1: 63 360 (i.e. 1 in. to the mile)
  Scale: 1: 63 360 (i.e. 1 in. to the mile)
  Scale: 1: 63 360 (i.e. 1 in. to the mile)

Maori

Maps
 Scale: 1: 39 600 (i.e. 1/1.6 in. to the mile)
 Scale: 1: 3 168 (i.e. 1/20 in. to the mile)
 Scale: 1: 50 000 (i.e. 1/1.27 in. to the mile)   NZMS 260 ; v Q18

People
Genealogical information, a family Bible, and sketches of the Mohakatino and Tongaporutu Rivers are contained within the Messenger family collection held within  in New Plymouth. William Messenger, his wife, Mary, and their adult children initially settled at Omata upon arriving in New Zealand in 1853. See 

Pat Greenfield Taranaki Daily News profile

New Plymouth District
Populated places in Taranaki